Thomas Arnold Ikunika Wilson is an Anglican bishop and scholar in Sierra Leone: he is the current Bishop of Freetown.

References

Anglican bishops of Freetown
21st-century Anglican bishops in Sierra Leone
Year of birth missing (living people)
Living people